Tiburones Rojos de Córdoba is a Mexican football club that plays in the Segunda División Profesional. The club is based in Cordoba, Veracruz.The club was born when Club Veracruz bought the Azucareros de Córdoba franchise in 2006.

See also
Football in Mexico

External links
Official Club Page

References 

Football clubs in Veracruz
Association football clubs established in 2006
2006 establishments in Mexico
Córdoba, Veracruz